Rhabdochaeta neavei is a species of tephritid or fruit flies in the genus Rhabdochaeta of the family Tephritidae.

Distribution
Malawi, Zimbabwe.

References

Tephritinae
Insects described in 1920
Taxa named by Mario Bezzi
Diptera of Africa